The 1967 Icelandic Cup was the eighth edition of the National Football Cup.

It took place between 29 July 1967 and 21 October 1967, with the final played at Melavöllur in Reykjavik. The cup was important, as winners qualified for the UEFA Cup Winners' Cup (if a club won both the league and the cup, the defeated finalists would take their place in the Cup Winners' Cup). Teams from the Úrvalsdeild karla (1st division) did not enter until the quarter finals. In prior rounds, teams from the 2. Deild (2nd division), as well as reserve teams, played in one-legged matches. In case of a draw, lots were drawn. From the semi-finals, after a replay, lots were drawn.

KR Reykjavik won their 7th Cup in 8 seasons, beating 2. Deild Vikingur Reykjavik, 3 - 0 in the final.

Preliminary round

First round

Second round

Third round

Quarter finals 
 Entrance of 6 clubs from 1. Deild

Semi finals

Final 

 KR Reykjavik won their seventh Icelandic Cup and qualified for the 1968–69 European Cup Winners' Cup.

See also 

 1967 Úrvalsdeild
 Icelandic Cup

External links 
  1967 Icelandic Cup results at the site of the Icelandic Football Federation

Icelandic Men's Football Cup
Iceland
1967 in Iceland